Robert Wilson (1890 – November 1918) was an American professional footballer who played in the Scottish League for Hibernian as an outside right. He was a part of the Hibs team which reached the 1914 Scottish Cup Final.

Personal life 
Wilson enlisted in the British Army during the First World War and died in November 1918.

Career statistics

References

External links 
 

1890 births
Date of birth missing
Soccer players from Chicago
Scottish Football League players
Scottish Junior Football Association players
Association football outside forwards
Hibernian F.C. players
Kirkintilloch Rob Roy F.C. players
British Army personnel of World War I
American emigrants to Scotland
American expatriate soccer players
American soccer players
Expatriate footballers in Scotland
1918 deaths
Date of death unknown
British military personnel killed in World War I